George Stanhope (1660–1728) was a Church of England clergyman.

George Stanhope may also refer to:

 George Stanhope, 6th Earl of Chesterfield (1805–1866), British Tory politician, courtier and race horse owner
 George Stanhope, 7th Earl of Chesterfield (1831–1871), British soldier and Conservative politician 
 George Stanhope, 8th Earl of Chesterfield (1822–1883)